John Lewyn was an English master mason of the late 14th century, responsible for major works at Durham Cathedral, Durham Castle, Carlisle Castle, Bolton Castle and Dunstanburgh Castle. He was considered the pre-eminent master mason of that time in the north of England. Lewyn vaulted the Prior's Kitchen at Durham with star vaulting.

References

14th-century English architects
Architects from County Durham